Bay Colony may refer to:
Massachusetts Bay Colony
Bay Colony Railroad
Bay Colony 1701, a locomotive
Bay Colony Stadium